is a Japanese four-panel manga series by Chiyo Kenmotsu, serialized in Houbunsha's seinen manga magazine Manga Time Kirara Carat since July 2018. It has been collected in four tankōbon volumes. An anime television series adaptation by Doga Kobo aired from April to June 2022.

Plot
The story begins 15 years after the demon king was defeated and the world has become peaceful. Kotone, who graduated from school and became a magician, inquired the kingdom-affiliated RPG Real Estate in order to find a new home. In reality, RPG Real Estate was Kotone's place of employment, and together with Fa, a demi-human, the priest Rufuria, and the soldier Rakira, they help support the searches of new homes for the customers with various circumstances.

Characters

The series protagonist, she is a girl with long pink twin-tailed hair. She takes up a job at the titular RPG Real Estate.

One of the workers are RPG Real Estate, she has light blue hair and a dragon tail. She is actually a dragon herself and can transform into one.

One of the workers are RPG Real Estate, she has long black twin-tailed hair. When she was young she was often mistaken for a boy due to her short hair, leading to her growing it out as she got older.

Media

Manga

Anime
An anime television series adaptation was announced on February 26, 2021. The series is animated by Doga Kobo and directed by Tomoaki Koshida, with screenplays by Yoshiko Nakamura, character designs by Motohiro Taniguchi, and music composed by Makoto Miyazaki. It aired from April 6 to June 22, 2022 on AT-X and other networks. The opening theme song is "Make Up Life!" by Honoka Inoue, Hina Kino, Natsumi Kawaida, and Manaka Iwami, while the ending theme song is "Awesome!" by Maneki Kecak. Crunchyroll has licensed the series.

Episode list

Notes

References

External links
 

2022 anime television series debuts
Anime series based on manga
AT-X (TV network) original programming
Crunchyroll anime
Doga Kobo
Fantasy anime and manga
Houbunsha manga
Kadokawa Dwango franchises
Seinen manga
Yonkoma